The Hardy Rocks are insular rocks lying  west of DuBois Island, in the Biscoe Islands of Antarctica. They were mapped from air photos taken by the Falkland Islands and Dependencies Aerial Survey Expedition (1956–57), and were named by the UK Antarctic Place-Names Committee for James D. Hardy, an American physiologist who has studied the reactions of the human body to cold environments.

References

Rock formations of the Biscoe Islands